Tuling is a town in the Quangang District of Fujian's Quanzhou Municipal Region.

Administration
The town executive, Chinese Communist Party sub-branch and public security bureau sub-station (paichusuo) are in Tuling Village.

The town administers 21 Village committees: 
 Tuling Village
 Xiuxi Village
 Xitou Village
 Baitong Village
 Qingmei Village
 Xialu Village
 Shishang Village
 Wenyang Village
 Lupu Village
 Song Yuan Village
 Xiaoba Village
 Qian'ou Village
 Lukou Village
 Qiuhou Village
 Yiban Village
 Wushe Village
 Xixi Village
 Tuxing Village
 Zhangjiao Village
 Zhaihou Village
 Huangtian Village

Notes and references

Quanzhou
Township-level divisions of Fujian